The U.S. state of Georgia is divided into 159 counties, more than any other state except for Texas, which has 254 counties. Under the Georgia State Constitution, all of its counties are granted home rule to deal with problems that are purely local in nature. Also, eight consolidated city-counties have been established in Georgia: Athens–Clarke County, Augusta–Richmond County, Columbus–Muscogee County, Georgetown–Quitman County, Statenville–Echols County, Macon–Bibb County, Cusseta–Chattahoochee County, and Preston-Webster County.

History
From 1732 until 1758, the minor civil divisions in Georgia were districts and towns. In 1758, the Province of Georgia was divided into eight parishes, and another four parishes were created in 1765. On February 5, 1777, the original eight counties of the state were created: Burke, Camden, Chatham, Effingham, Glynn, Liberty, Richmond, and Wilkes.

Georgia has the second-largest number of counties of any state in the United States, only behind Texas which has 254 counties. One traditional reasoning for the creation and location of so many counties in Georgia was that a country farmer, rancher, or lumberman should be able to travel to the legal county seat town or city, and then back home, in one day on horseback or via wagon. About 25 counties in Georgia were created in the first quarter of the 20th century, after the use of the railroad, automobile, truck, and bus had become possible. Because of the County Unit System, later declared unconstitutional, new counties, no matter the population, had at least one representative in the state house, keeping political power in rural areas. The last new county to be established in Georgia was Peach County, founded 1924.

The proliferation of counties in Georgia led to multiple state constitutional amendments attempting to limit the number of counties. The most recent such amendment, ratified in 1945, limited the number to 159 counties, although there had been 161 counties from 1924 to 1931. In a rare consolidation of counties, both Campbell County and Milton County were annexed into Fulton County in 1932 as a financial move during the Great Depression, since those two county governments were nearly bankrupt.
Fulton County contains Atlanta, and it was thought that tax revenues from Atlanta and its suburbs would help to support the rural areas of the discarded counties, which had very little tax income of their own—mostly from property taxes on farms and forests, which did not amount to much.

Georgia is the only state which still allows sole commissioner county government. Currently, nine of the state's 159 counties operate under that system.

During the 2022 legislative session, the Georgia General Assembly began considering reducing the number of counties in the state. Despite the state increasing in population by over one million according to the 2020 Census, 67 counties lost population, mostly in rural areas. The rationale for consolidating counties is to reduce costs for county services such as school systems, law enforcement and elections.

Changed names of counties
A few counties in Georgia have had their names changed. Jasper County was originally named "Randolph County". Later, the present-day Randolph County was founded. Webster County was once named "Kinchafoonee County", and Bartow County was originally named "Cass County".

Defunct counties
 St. George, St. Mary's, St. Thomas, St. Phillip, Christ Church, St. David, St. Matthews, St. Andrew, St. James, St. Johns, and St. Paul were all parishes that were dissolved in 1777 with the establishment of the charter counties.
Bourbon County (1785–1788): Formed out of disputed Yazoo lands in present-day Mississippi; dissolved in 1788.
 Campbell County (1828–1932): Formed from Carroll and Coweta in 1828. At dissolution, areas northwest of Chattahoochee River became Douglas in 1870, remainder was merged into southwest Fulton in 1932.
 Milton County (1857–1932): Formed from northeast Cobb, southeast Cherokee, and southwest Forsyth in 1857 (and later northern DeKalb), was merged into north Fulton in 1932.
 There was a previous Walton County in Georgia, which was actually located in what is now western North Carolina. A brief skirmish, the Walton War, was fought between North Carolina and Georgia in 1810, before Georgia relinquished its claim on that area after the 1811 survey of Ellicott Rock.

Majority-minority counties

Per the 2020 Census, 36 of Georgia's 159 counties are majority-minority. Eighteen have African-American majorities and 18 are majority-minority with no dominant group. An influx of immigrants to the Atlanta metropolitan area and Latino workers to the Black Belt has helped to fuel the shift.

Fictional counties

Film
 Deliverance (1972) is set in a North Georgia county marked on the sheriff's car as Aintry.
 Diggstown (1992) takes place in the fictional Olivera County.
 Gator (1976) takes place in the fictional Dunston County.
 Ghost Fever (1987) takes place in the county of Greendale.
Smokey Bites the Dust (1981) takes place in Paraquat County, Georgia.
Tank (1984) takes place in the fictional Clemmons County. Although set as a county bordering Tennessee, the filming location was at or near Fort Benning much closer to Alabama than to Tennessee.
The Ugly Dachshund (1966) takes place in Paraquat County, Georgia.

Television
 The Dukes of Hazzard (1979–1985) takes place in both Hazzard County, Georgia and Chickasaw County, Georgia.
 The Misadventures of Sheriff Lobo (1979–1981) takes place in Orly County, Georgia.
 Rectify (2013–2016), the SundanceTV original series, takes place in Paulie County, Georgia.
 Squidbillies (2005–present), an animated Adult Swim series about anthropomorphic cephalopods, is set in rural Dougal County (a possible reference to Douglas County) in the hills of North Georgia.
 The Walking Dead (2010–present) names three fictional counties in Georgia: King County, Linden County, and Mert County.

Theater
 The Foreigner (1983), a play by Larry Shue, takes place in Tilghman County, Georgia.

Books
 Karin Slaughter's novels are often set in  Grant County, Georgia.
 In The Green Mile, John Coffey is wrongfully arrested in Trapingus County, Georgia.

Counties listing

|}

See also
 List of county seats in Georgia
 List of county courthouses in Georgia

References

External links
  on counties and municipal corporations
 
 
 
 

Georgia, Counties In

Counties